Thringarth is a hamlet in Lunedale, in the Pennines of England. It is traditionally located in the North Riding of Yorkshire but along with the rest of the former Startforth Rural District it was transferred to County Durham for administrative and ceremonial purposes on 1 April 1974, under the provisions of the Local Government Act 1972.

External links

Villages in County Durham